Narasimha I (r. 1152–1173 CE) was a ruler of the Hoysala Empire. His victory over his overlord Western Chalukya Empire King Tailapa III paved the way for the declaration of independence by his successor, and is his main legacy. Tailapa III was killed by Narasimha I. He however failed to meet the challenge of their Kalachuri feudatory Bijjala II. Narasimha I was overthrown by his son Veera Ballala II.

Rule
Narasimha I's general Hulla built a charity-house at Jinanathapura (near Shravanabelagola) in 1163 CE and Bhandara Basadi in 1159 CE.

References

Citations

Sources
 Dr. Suryanath U. Kamat, A Concise history of Karnataka from pre-historic times to the present, Jupiter books, MCC, Bangalore, 2001 (Reprinted 2002) OCLC: 7796041

External links
History of Karnataka, Arthikaje

1173 deaths
Hoysala kings
Hindu monarchs
Year of birth unknown
12th-century Indian monarchs
12th-century Hindus